New Brighton Pier was a pleasure and fishing pier in New Brighton, Wallasey (then part of Cheshire) in England, built during the late 1860s at a length of .

The pier helped New Brighton become a popular seaside resort, particularly with visitors from Liverpool, who would travel by ferry across the River Mersey. During World War II, the pier helped protect the River Mersey and prevent passage into Liverpool.

Following expansion by Liverpool Docks, the beach became polluted and ferries to the pier ceased in 1971. By 1976, the pier was under threat of demolition and local pressure groups were established to help save it. Despite local support, the pier was operating at a loss by 1977 and was ultimately demolished in 1978.

History
James Atherton, a merchant and property developer, was primarily responsible for creating New Brighton and considered it ripe for development. Along with his son-in-law William Rowson, he developed the area with villas and road networks.

Wooden pier

In October 1832, Atherton and Rowson invited investors to purchase £100 shares to aid construction of a hotel and ferry link to Liverpool. The landing stage could not be used during low tide, with passengers either having to wade through the water or be transported in small boats. The vessel Sir John Moore ran an hourly service to Liverpool, taking around 25 minutes in good weather. After James Atherton died in 1838, his sons continued to run the ferry service until 1845, when responsibility was passed to Messrs Lodge Pritchard & Company. The entrance to the pier housed a refreshment room, with new additions costing around £3,000 and were complemented by new steamboats, the Queen of Beauty and James Atherton. In 1848, plans to extend the pier failed to materialise, with a gale damaging the shore end. When the Egremont ferry service was taken over by The Coulborns in May 1848, the New Brighton service was suspended during the winter of 1849–50 as a cost saving measure, though later reopened.

Out of the three ferry services operating around Wallasey, including those at Seacombe and Egremont, the New Brighton service was the most profitable, with receipts in 1859 totalling £9,042. The landing problems at low tide continued to be an issue, with the old landing stage unreliable.

Planning
The Wallasey Improvement Act 1864 gave powers to construct a new ferry pier, with the council opting for a design by James Brunlees for an iron pier, although it chose not to have Brunlees as engineer-in-charge. The new pier was designed to incorporate a floating landing stage and be located slightly north-east of the original pier, enabling the old pier to continue operation while the new one was being constructed.

On 25 July 1864, the New Brighton Promenade Pier Company was established with £30,000 in capital to construct a promenade pier next to the existing ferry pier, with a design by Eugenius Birch, who at the time was a well known pier designer, chosen. His design was unusual insofar as only being reachable via the ferry pier and not from the shore directly. The 'New Brighton Pier Act, 1864' permitted three years for the construction work to be completed, as well as stipulating that nuisances should be prevented and for light "to be exhibited on the pier".

Construction
Joseph Dowson, who had assisted Birch in the construction of Aberystwyth Pier, was contracted to build the promenade pier. The first of 120 columns was fixed in place on 19 December 1866 and construction progressed without many problems.

Operation
The new pier opened on 20 May 1866, eventually costing £23,906 which was significantly more than the original £9,250 estimate. The pier officially opened to the public on 7 September 1867, although work was not fully completed until the following year on 9 April 1868, when the pier was officially handed over having cost a total of £27,000 to construct. Admission cost 2d with an additional 1d to reach the upper deck.

On 3 October 1867, the bridge and landing stage were destroyed by the steamer Galileo during a gale, with the landing stage floating out into the river, although it was rescued by other boats. The landing stage was repaired at a cost of £3,850 and reopened on 28 May 1868, although work to anchor it more securely to the seabed continued into 1869. Famous divers were also known to have dived off the pier, including Tommy Burns and Ted Heaton. Various schemes to make the pier longer never materialised, resulting in the council often having to dredge sand from around the pier head so that ferries could continue to call. Eventually in August 1881, £22,000 was borrowed to allow for the enlargement of the pier and landing stage.

Passenger numbers from those landed by ferries for the year ending 31 March 1898 were over 2.7 million, which was an increase of over 300,000 from the preceding year. In 1909–1910, the pavilion was refurbished, which included completely redecorating and installing a new heating system. On 16 March 1907, part of the landing stage collapsed which caused the pontoon to float down the river for some distance. The southern bridge also sustained significant damage and was replaced on 29 August 1907.

Post World War I

By the 1920s, the pier required maintenance which was unaffordable to the pier company. Ultimately, the pavilion closed in 1923 and the Board of Trade later declared the pier as unsafe. In 1928, the pier was purchased for £13,000 by Wallasey Corporation, who spent £31,354 replacing all the buildings, including the pavilion which was replaced with a bandstand and clubhouse. The pier reopened in 1930 following improvement works, with further improvements made during the winter of 1935–1936, which included making the deck wider and building a new booking hall.

The pier was used during World War II to help protect the River Mersey and passage into Liverpool, with some accounts suggesting that the pier was fitted with torpedo tubes. Following the war, a German submarine periscope was placed on the pier which allowed visitors to view through it, as U-boat commanders would have done, for a small charge. In June 1958, a 22-year-old man, Bernard Lloyd, died when he danced off the pier and fell  to the rocks below. His 20-year-old partner was also seriously injured.

Decline and closure
In 1965, the pier was closed by the council, the decline in part attributed to the loss of the golden sands as a result of expansion from Liverpool Docks altering the currents which created a polluted foreshore. In December 1966, a town meeting on the pier's future ended with a vote of 168 to 87 in favour of removing the pier, with the council claiming that it could save £47,000 if it were demolished. John Brindle, a club owner, suggested that amalgamating both the ferry and promenade pier, which were then adjacent to each other, would mean the cost of saving the pier would be just £12,500.

The pier was later leased to a subsidiary of Fortes, who reopened it in June 1968. Despite around £200,000 of improvements being made, the pier finally closed in November 1972. Ferries across the Mersey to New Brighton had already ceased in 1971, with the last ferry having left on 26 September 1971. Despite proposals planned to be submitted to the Secretary of State for the Environment Peter Walker MP, designed to try and save the ferry by removing the sandbank and building two large retaining walls in a delta shape, this ultimately did not come to fruition and the ferry pier with its landing stage were subsequently dismantled. The pier closed in 1975 on advice from engineers who declared it as dangerous, with some metal being described as "wafer thin" from corrosion.

On 19 July 1976, the 'Save New Brighton Pier' action committee were formed, and planned to enlist the support of The Beatles and The Spinners to help with their cause, who they suggested owe their early careers to the pier. In October 1976, Wallasey MP Lynda Chalker invited residents to let her know if they wanted to save the pier for £40,000, as it may be their last chance to do so, with arrangements being made for a local inquiry. Chalker gave a speech at a special meeting on 14 January 1977 in a bid to win further support for the 'Save the Pier' campaign. An inquiry was held later in January 1977, with the council chamber crowded with representatives from the 'New Brighton Pier Action Committee', local hoteliers and the 'Wallasey Historical Society' to name a few.

Demolition
By 1977, the promenade pier was operating at a loss and had become unsafe due to lack of appropriate maintenance, with Wirral Borough Council estimating that basic repairs alone would cost £170,000, not including annual maintenance or insurance. Wirral planning authority acknowledged that the pier was "a structure of architectural and historic interest", but did not believe that restoration investment was likely as there would be considerable expense and a need for a "substantial future annual maintenance" commitment. In June, the Secretary of State for the Environment Peter Shore granted permission for the pier's demolition which was by then described as "a pier of undistinguised appearance". In November 1977, maritime approval for the pier's demolition had been received from the Mersey Docks and Harbour Company and it was ultimately demolished starting in February 1978 and completed in July 1978.

Renewal proposals
A regeneration plan was announced in 2002 by Neptune Developments Ltd, which was proposed to include a new  pier on the site of the original pier at a cost of £3.5 million, although this did not come to fruition.

References
Citations

Sources

 
 

New Brighton, Merseyside
Piers in Merseyside
Buildings and structures demolished in 1978
Demolished buildings and structures in England